The 2021–22 Northwestern State Demons basketball team represented Northwestern State University in the 2021–22 NCAA Division I men's basketball season. The Demons, led by 23rd-year head coach Mike McConathy, played their home games at Prather Coliseum in Natchitoches, Louisiana as members of the Southland Conference. They finished the season 9–23, 5–9 in Southland play to finish sixth place. They lost in the first round of the Southland tournament to McNeese State.

After the season, head coach Mike McConathy announced his retirement. On March 23, 2022, the school named former Missouri State assistant Corey Gipson the team's new head coach.

Previous season
In a season limited due to the ongoing COVID-19 pandemic, the Demons finished the 2020–21 season 11–18, 9–7 in Southland play to finish in fifth place. They defeated New Orleans in the quarterfinals of the Southland tournament, before falling to New Orleans in the semifinals.

Roster

Schedule and results

|-
!colspan=12 style=| Non-conference regular season

|-
!colspan=12 style=| Southland regular season

|-
!colspan=9 style=| Southland tournament
 

Sources

References

Northwestern State Demons basketball seasons
Northwestern State Demons
Northwestern State Demons basketball
Northwestern State Demons basketball